Sturston is a deserted village and civil parish in the English county of Norfolk.

The village became deserted when it was taken over by the British Army during the Second World War as part of the Stanford Battle Area, an infantry training area that is still in use today. The village and most of the parish are within a prohibited area and access is not allowed without special permission from the Army.

For the purposes of local government, the parish falls within the district of Breckland.

References
 Ordnance Survey (1999). OS Explorer Map 229 - Thetford in the Brecks. .
 Rootsweb.com (1998–2006). Ghost Towns/Deserted Villages of Great Britain. Retrieved 17 February 2006.
 Office for National Statistics & Norfolk County Council (2001). Census population and household counts for unparished urban areas and all parishes. Retrieved 2 December 2005.

External links
Information from Genuki Norfolk on Sturston.
Information from NorfolkChurches.co.uk on the Stanford Battle Area and its deserted villages and churches.

Former populated places in Norfolk
Villages in Norfolk
Ghost towns in England
Civil parishes in Norfolk
Breckland District

Forcibly depopulated communities in the United Kingdom during World War II